Raven Productions is a television production company based in Palm Springs, California.

Organized in California in 1987, the company initially became known for its outdoor adventure programming for networks as Fox Sports Net, ESPN, PBS, PrimeSportschannel, Travel Channel and Outdoor Life. Its signature outdoor adventure series, Great Sports Vacations, aired on the Travel Channel and Fox Sports Net.

In the late 1990s through a joint venture with the Judy Garland estate, the company embarked on production of a series of PBS pledge specials featuring vintage performances of the late Judy Garland, including "Judy, Frank & Dean" featuring Judy with Frank Sinatra and Dean Martin.
 Under agreement with the late Sid Luft, former husband of Judy Garland, the company also produced and released to PBS affiliates "Judy Garland Duets" featuring vintage performances of Judy with Barbra Streisand, Liza Minnelli, Count Basie, Tony Bennett, Mickey Rooney and others.

In September 2001, Raven's Earth Trek, an environmentally conscious travel series, began airing on PBS stations nationally.

In 2004, Raven's weekly series Hello Paradise premiered on KVCR-TV, a Southern California PBS station. The series features celebrities, attractions, events, hotels and restaurants in Palm Springs and the desert communities.

In 2007, the company produced Donovan Live in LA which was shot at the Kodak Theatre in Hollywood and featured the singer / songwriter, Donovan. The program was released to PBS stations with proceeds benefiting director David Lynch's Foundation for Consciousness Based Education and World Peace.

In 2008, the company produced its sixth PBS pledge special, Trini Lopez presents Latin Music Legends, recorded live-to-tape at the Orpheum Theatre in Los Angeles, starring Trini Lopez and featuring Julio Iglesias, Thee Midnighters, Tierra, El Chicano and the Greg Rolie Band.

Its sister company, PSTV Partners, is the holder of FCC broadcast license for K09XW channel 9 in Palm Desert and, through a partnership with the San Bernardino Community College District, is rebroadcasting KVCR-DT.

References

External links 
 Raven Productions – Official Website

Television production companies of the United States
Companies based in Riverside County, California